Dr. Erich W. Etienne (24 February 191523 July 1942) was a German geophysicist, polar explorer and pilot.

Early life 
Erich Etienne was born in Leipzig and studied geophysics in Leipzig and Exeter before going to the University of Oxford on a Rhodes Scholarship in 1934. He then took part in the Oxford University Greenland Expeditions of the Oxford University Exploration Club in 1936 and 1938. In 1939 he received his doctorate under Ludwig Weickmann at the University of Leipzig.

Second World War 
During the Second World War, Etienne became a pilot and flight meteorologist in the Luftwaffe. From the autumn of 1940 he was assigned as a weather observer and meteorological advisor to Wettererkundungsstaffel 5 based at Trondheim-Værnes. His doctoral supervisor Weickmann had previously been appointed chief meteorologist at Luftflotte 5. In September 1940 Etienne was assigned to the crew of a Heinkel He 115, which flew reconnaissance missions in preparations for the Axis landing at Jan Mayen island.

In 1941–1942 Etienne led Operation Bansö, a German effort to set up a manned weather station on Spitsbergen.

Erich Etienne was shot down and killed on July 23, 1942 during a reconnaissance flight over Svalbard's capital Longyearbyen.

Publications 
 1940 Expeditionsbericht der Grönland-Expedition der Universität Oxford 1938. Veröffentlichungen des Geophysikalischen Instituts der Universität Leipzig, Serie 2, Bd. 13. (GND 363590579)
 1940 Geophysikalische Arbeiten auf einer Grönland-Expedition. Borna-Leipzig. (GND 570149665)

References

External links 
 Hans Macht: Erich Etienne (zum zehnjährlgen Todestag am 23. Juli 1952). Polarforschung 22, 1/2, 1952, S. 197–198.

German polar explorers
German geophysicists
1915 births
1942 deaths
Luftwaffe pilots
Luftwaffe personnel killed in World War II
Aviators killed by being shot down
Alumni of the University of Exeter
German Rhodes Scholars